Nibaran may refer to

Nibaran Chandra Laskar, Indian Politician 
Nibaran Chandra Mukherjee, Indian reformer
Dukhulal Nibaran Chandra College, located in Murshidabad 

Indian masculine given names